Sturisoma lyra is a species of armored catfish native to Brazil and Peru where it is found in the Juruá River basin.  This species grows to a length of  TL.

References
 

Sturisoma
Fish of South America
Fish of Brazil
Fish of Peru
Fish described in 1904